The Way That I Am is the second studio album by American country music singer Martina McBride, released on September 14, 1993, through RCA Nashville. It was certified Platinum on May 15, 1995, by the Recording Industry Association of America (RIAA). This was her breakthrough album, producing her first Top 5 hit in "My Baby Loves Me", which was previously released as a single by Canadian singer Patricia Conroy from her 1992 album Bad Day for Trains. McBride's version was a number 2 hit on the Hot Country Songs. Also released as singles from this album were "Life #9" at number 6, "Independence Day" at number 12, "Heart Trouble" at number 21, and "Where I Used to Have a Heart" at number 49.

Content
Although never released as a single, "Strangers" was reprised on McBride's Greatest Hits album in 2001. In the liner notes of that album, she stated that she included the song because it was a fan favorite, and she felt that it would have been a better follow-up to "Independence Day" than "Heart Trouble" and "Where I Used to Have a Heart" were.

The Compact Cassette version of this album omits the final track, "Ashes".

Track listing

Personnel
Compiled from liner notes.

Musicians

 Grace Mihi Bahng – cello (3)
 Brett Beavers – backing vocals (6 & 10)
 Joe Chemay – bass guitar 
 Ashley Cleveland – backing vocals (4)
 Deryl Dodd – backing vocals (6 & 10)
 Dan Dugmore – electric guitar (2)
 Larry Franklin – fiddle (1, 8 & 10)
 Paul Franklin – pedal steel guitar (4 & 8)
 Johnny Garcia – electric guitar (1)
 Vicki Hampton – backing vocals (4)
 Dann Huff – electric guitar (2, 6 & 7)
 Bill Hullett – acoustic guitar (1, 3-5 & 8-10)
 Mary Ann Kennedy – backing vocals (2, 4 & 7)
 Martina McBride – lead vocals, backing vocals (2, 4, & 7-9), tambourine (6)
 Anthony S. Martin – backing vocals (8), keyboards (9)
 Brent Mason – electric guitar (1, 3-5 & 8-10)
 Steve Nathan – keyboards (except 9)
 Mary Kathryn Van Osdale – violin (3)
 Herb Pedersen – backing vocals (5)
 Pam Rose – backing vocals (2, 4 & 7)
 John Wesley Ryles – backing vocals (1, 8 & 9)
 Biff Watson – acoustic guitar (1 & 5-7)
 Charlie Whitten – pedal steel guitar (6, 7, 9 & 10)
 Kris Wilkinson – viola (3)
 Dennis Wilson – backing vocals (1, 8 & 9)
 Lonnie Wilson – drums
 Paul Worley – electric guitar (1, 2, 6 & 7), acoustic guitar 

Production
 Don Cobb – digital editor
 Carlos Grier – digital editor
 Martina McBride – producer
 Anthony S. Martin – assistant producer
 Mike Poole – recording engineer
 Denny Purcell – mastering engineer
 Clarke Schleicher – recording engineer
 Ed Seay – production, recording engineer
 Paul Worley – producer

Charts

Weekly charts

Year-end charts

Singles

Certifications

References

1993 albums
Martina McBride albums
RCA Records albums
Albums produced by Paul Worley